Arge berberidis, common name berberis sawfly, is a species of sawflies belonging to the family Argidae subfamily Arginae.

Description 
Adults have bluish-black head and body. Wings are brown. This species has saws-sheath shaped tong. Larvae show black head and a greyish body with many small black spots and some yellowish blotches.

Biology
Larvae are considered a severe pest causing defoliation in the host plants (Mahonia and Berberis). Adults fly from June to August.

Distribution 
This sawfly is present in most of Europe (Austria, Belgium, Bulgaria, Switzerland, Czech Republic, Germany, Danish mainland, Spanish mainland, France, Greek mainland, Hungary, Italy, Macedonia, The Nederlands, Poland, Romania, European Russia, Slovakia, Ukraine, United Kingdom).

Habitat
These sawflies can be found on Mahonia and Berberis species.

References

Taeger, A., Blank, S. M. & Liston, A. D. 2010  - World Catalog of Symphyta (Hymenoptera). Zootaxa 2580: 1–1064. Magnolia Press, Auckland

External links
 British Nature Guide - An incomplete guide to the wildlife of Britain

Argidae
Insects described in 1802
Hymenoptera of Europe